David Pretty (1878–1947) was a New Zealand bushman, axeman, athlete and farmer. He was born in Okete, Waikato, New Zealand in 1878.

References

1878 births
1947 deaths
People from Waikato
New Zealand farmers